Brass Buttons is a 1919 American silent comedy Western film directed by Henry King, and starring William Russell, Eileen Percy, and Helen Howard. A New York cop in Arizona tackles a gang of criminals.

Cast
 William Russell as Kingdon Hollister 
 Eileen Percy as Bernice Cleveland 
 Helen Howard as Madeline
 Frank Brownlee as Terence Callahan 
 Bull Montana as Jake the Priest 
 Wilbur Higby as Mayor Dave McCullough 
 Carl Stockdale as Cold-Deck Dallas

References

Bibliography
 Donald W. McCaffrey & Christopher P. Jacobs. Guide to the Silent Years of American Cinema. Greenwood Publishing, 1999.

External links
 

1919 films
1910s Western (genre) comedy films
Films directed by Henry King
Pathé Exchange films
American black-and-white films
1919 comedy films
Silent American Western (genre) comedy films
1910s American films
1910s English-language films